Carlos Estévez is a Cuban visual artist. He received the Grand Prize in the First Salon of Contemporary Cuban Art in 1995, as well as The Joan Mitchell Foundation Painters & Sculptors Grant in 2015.

Biography 
Carlos Estévez was born in Havana in 1969. Estévez graduated from the Instituto Superior de Arte, Havana, Cuba, in 1992. He has done residencies at the Academia de San Carlos, UNAM, Mexico (1997), Gasworks Studios, London, England (1997), the UNESCO-ASCHBERG in The Nordic Artists' Center in Dale, Norway (1998), Art-OMI Foundation, New York, USA (1998), The Massachusetts College of Art, Boston, MA, USA (2002), Cité internationale des arts in Paris, (2003–2004), Montclair University, New Jersey, USA (2005), and the McColl Center in Charlotte, NC, USA (2016). He received the Grand Prize in the First Salon of Contemporary Cuban Art in 1995, as well as The Joan Mitchell Foundation Painters & Sculptors Grant in 2015. 

His work at the McColl Center in Charlotte formed the foundation for what would eventually become an extensive proficiency in ceramics. In the four months that he spent at the center, he made over 200 ceramic pieces. His plates, especially, have a unique elegance and concentrate on color, expressive shapes, and thematic abstractions that refer to architecture, astronomy, and anatomy.

Selected exhibitions

Solo exhibitions  
FIREWORKS, Kendall Art Center, Miami, FL, USA
Fine Arts Museum, Havana, Cuba
The Patricia and Phillip Frost Art Museum at Florida International University, Miami, FL, USA
Couturier Gallery, Los Angeles, CA, USA
Center of Contemporary Art, New Orleans, LA, USA
Pan American Art Projects, Miami, FL, USA
LaCa Projects, Charlotte, NC, USA
Denise Bibro Fine Art, Chelsea, NY, USA
Havana Galerie, Zurich, Switzerland
JM' Arts Galerie, Paris, France
Alva Gallery, New London, CT, USA
Enlace Arte Contemporáneo, Lima, Peru
Promo-arte Gallery, Tokyo, Japan
Lyle O. Reitzel Gallery, Santo Domingo, Dominican Republic
Taylor Bercier Gallery, New Orleans, LA, USA
UB Galleries, Buffalo University, USA

Group exhibitions 
VI and VII Havana Biennale, Cuba
The traveling exhibit Contemporary Art from Cuba: Irony and Survival on the Utopian Island at the Arizona State University Art Museum in Tempe, USA
Cuba Avant-Garde: Contemporary Cuban Art from the Farber Collection.

References 

1969 births
Living people
Artists from Havana
Cuban ceramists